The women's 1000 m speed skating competition for the 2002 Winter Olympics was held in Salt Lake City, Utah, United States.

After suffering from mononucleosis, Chris Witty skated a new world record to a surprise win. Jennifer Rodriguez became the first US Hispanic woman to win an Olympic speed skating medal.

Records

Prior to this competition, the existing world and Olympic records were as follows.

The following new world and Olympic records were set during this competition.

Results

References

Women's speed skating at the 2002 Winter Olympics
Women's events at the 2002 Winter Olympics